Badister flavipes is a species of ground beetle in the family Carabidae. It is found in the Caribbean Sea, Central America, North America, and South America.

Subspecies
These two subspecies belong to the species Badister flavipes:
 Badister flavipes flavipes LeConte, 1853
 Badister flavipes mexicanus Van Dyke, 1945

References

Further reading

 

Harpalinae
Articles created by Qbugbot
Beetles described in 1853